Dédié à toi is a French studio album released by Dalida in 1979.

Background 

In this album, Dalida sings once more Jacques Brel's "Quand on n'a que l'amour". She also memorializes her late lover Luigi Tenco through a cover of one of his masterpieces, "Vedrai vedrai". It includes her hit "Monday, Tuesday... Laissez-moi danser", and a patriotic homage to her birth country, Egypt, "Helwa ya balady".

The album proved to be one of Dalida's most successful albums of the seventies, selling millions of copies.

Track listing 
 "Dédié à toi"
 "The Lambeth Walk" (English)
 "Va, va, va"
 "Quand on n'a que l'amour"
 "Helwa ya balady"
 "Vedrai vedrai"
 "Comme disait Mistinguett"
 "Problemorama (L'argent... l'argent...)"
 "Monday, Tuesday... Laissez-moi danser"
 "Depuis qu'il vient chez nous"

Singles 
 "Le Lambeth Walk... C'était pas compliqué"
 Helwa ya balady
 "Problemorama" / "Depuis qu'il vient chez nous"
 "Monday, Tuesday... Laissez-moi danser"

References 

Dalida albums
1979 albums